Patrick Müller (born 18 April 1996) is a Swiss former professional cyclist, who competed as a professional for the  team in 2018 and 2019.

Major results

2013
 National Junior Road Championships
1st  Road race
2nd Time trial
 1st Tour de Berne juniors
 3rd  Team pursuit, UEC European Junior Track Championships
 4th Overall Tour du Pays de Vaud
1st Stage 3
2014
 1st  Road race, National Junior Road Championships
 8th Overall Tour du Pays de Vaud
1st Points classification
1st Stage 3
2015
 1st  Road race, National Under-23 Road Championships
 2nd  Team pursuit, 2015–16 UCI Track Cycling World Cup, Cali
 2nd  Team pursuit, UEC European Under-23 Track Championships
 10th Overall Rhône-Alpes Isère Tour
2016
 1st Giro del Belvedere
 1st Stage 1 (TTT) Giro della Valle d'Aosta
 2nd Trofeo Banca Popolare di Vicenza
 3rd Time trial, National Under-23 Road Championships
 4th Piccolo Giro di Lombardia
 6th Kernen Omloop Echt-Susteren
 8th Gran Premio Palio del Recioto
 10th Road race, UEC European Under-23 Road Championships
2017
 3rd Eschborn-Frankfurt City Loop U23
 4th Ronde van Vlaanderen U23
 5th Road race, National Road Championships
 7th Liège–Bastogne–Liège U23
 10th Ghent–Wevelgem U23
2018
 9th Road race, UCI Under-23 Road World Championships
2019
 1st Volta Limburg Classic
 4th Overall Circuit de la Sarthe
1st  Young rider classification
 6th Classic Sud-Ardèche

References

External links

1996 births
Living people
Swiss male cyclists
Cyclists from Zürich